Agyneta aquila is a species of sheet weaver found in Canada. It was described by Dupérré in 2013.

References

aquila
Fauna of Canada
Spiders of North America
Spiders described in 2013
Fauna without expected TNC conservation status